...Cooks! is an ITV television cookery show, hosted by Antony Worrall Thompson, broadcast between 10 June 2006 to 21 May 2010.

Formats
There were different names for the show, depending on which day it aired.  The Saturday morning show was called Saturday Cooks!, whilst the show that aired during the week was called Daily Cooks Challenge. This series aired in a weekday prime-time slot and from its second series was shot in front of a studio audience.

Worrall Thompson, who previously hosted a similar BBC One show, Saturday Kitchen, defected to ITV in June 2006 after being poached from the BBC along with the production company that made the show (Prospect Pictures), in a deal negotiated by Alison Sharman.  It was Sharman who originally brokered the deal that brought Worrall Thompson to the BBC on Saturday Kitchen in the first place, before she herself moved to ITV.

A sister programme Sunday Feast aired on Sunday mornings.  The programme was cancelled due to poor ratings.

A brand new series of Daily Cooks Challenge was broadcast from 29 March 2008 to 21 May 2010.

Scheduling
Saturday Cooks! aired on the ITV network from 10 June 2006 to 15 December 2007.  When it first started it aired at 9:25 am but then was moved first to 11:30 am and later, in 2007, to 12 noon.  This was to initially compete with the BBC's offering Saturday Kitchen.

Spin-offs
A spin-off series, Christmas Cooks! aired during the Christmas period in 2006 at 10:30 am on weekday mornings on the ITV network.  It returned for a second series in December 2007.  In 2008, Christmas Cooks! was replaced by Christmas Cooks Challenge.  In the 2009 'Christmas Specials' there were three selected Christmas Cooks episodes, which were repeated from 2008.  In 2010, there were no episodes over the festive period.

A brand new series of Daily Cooks Challenge was broadcast from 29 March 2010 to 21 May 2010.

Regular weekly chefs

Antony Worrall Thompson
Gino D'Acampo
Jean-Christophe Novelli
Brian Turner

Guest chefs

Ken Hom
Keith Floyd
Ching-He Huang
Ed Baines
Eadie Manson
Frank Bordoni
Merrilees Parker
Jun Tanaka
Maria Elia
Sophie Wright
Paul Rankin
Martin Blunos
Silvana Franco
Rustie Lee
Jill Dupleix
Aldo Zilli
Mary Berry
Richard Phillips
Ben O'Donoghue
Andrew Nutter
Momma Cherri
Jo Pratt

Wine experts

Jilly Goolden
Matt Skinner
Joe Wadsack

DVDs 
 Daily Cooks Challenge: Mains Volume One
 Daily Cooks Challenge: Mains Volume Two
Daily Cooks Challenge: Desserts
Daily Cooks Challenge: 3 DVD Box set

See also
List of celebrities appearing on Daily Cooks Challenge

References

External links

2006 British television series debuts
2010 British television series endings
2000s British cooking television series
2010s British cooking television series
British cooking television shows
English-language television shows
ITV (TV network) original programming